Scott Clifton Snyder (born October 31, 1984), better known as Scott Clifton, is an American actor, and video blogger. He played Dillon Quartermaine in General Hospital (2003–2007), Schuyler Joplin in One Life to Live (2009–2010), and Liam Spencer in The Bold and the Beautiful (2010–present). He has won three Daytime Emmy Awards.

Early life and family
Clifton was born on October 31, 1984, the only child of Ron and Faye Snyder, in Los Angeles, United States. His father is of "Russian Yiddish" descent and his mother has Scottish ancestry. He was raised in the Greater Los Angeles Area of southern California, including the Santa Clarita Valley and the San Fernando Valley.

Acting career

Early roles and success
Clifton started acting in commercials at the age of 16. His early roles included appearances on shows such as Roswell, Undressed, and Judging Amy.

He is best known for playing Dillon Quartermaine in General Hospital (2003-2007), Schuyler Joplin in One Life to Live (2009-2010), and Liam Spencer in The Bold and the Beautiful (2010–present). His role in B&B earned him three Daytime Emmy Awards in 2011, 2013, and 2017.

Musical career
Clifton is also a singer, guitarist, and songwriter.

In an initial bid to launch his musical career, he uploaded several songs to the internet, and later compiled these songs among previously unpublished material on his first EP album, Untitled. He later released a second EP, Unbeautiful, as well as two full-length albums, So Much for the Nightlife (in 2006) and Mannequin. Each was produced by Jeff Pescetto. He then released Girl Go Home.

Personal life

Clifton married his longtime girlfriend Nicole Lampson on October 20, 2012. Their wedding was attended by some The Bold and the Beautiful co-stars: John McCook, Don Diamont, Ronn Moss, Adam Gregory, Kim Matula, Jacqueline MacInnes Wood and many others. On May 6, 2016, they welcomed their first child, a son. In February 2023, Clifton announced his separation from Lampson.

Clifton is an atheist. On July 19, 2020, he co-hosted episode 24.29 of The Atheist Experience with Matt Dillahunty.

Filmography

Film and television performances
 (2002): Terminal Error as Jock
 (2004): Arizona Summer as Brooke
 (2006): The Death Strip as Mike Kohler

Television appearances

Other media

Discography

Studio albums

Extended plays

Other appearances

Awards and nominations

See also

References

External links

Official Scott Clifton Website

Scott Clifton, at Tuesday Afternoon, an online philosophy newsletter and podcast. Scott Clifton acts as a contributing editor.

1984 births
Male actors from Los Angeles
American atheists
American male film actors
American male soap opera actors
American people of Russian descent
American people of Scottish descent
Critics of religions
Living people
Musicians from Los Angeles
Daytime Emmy Award winners
Daytime Emmy Award for Outstanding Lead Actor in a Drama Series winners
Daytime Emmy Award for Outstanding Supporting Actor in a Drama Series winners
Daytime Emmy Award for Outstanding Younger Actor in a Drama Series winners
American YouTubers